Lake Township is the name of some places in the U.S. state of Michigan:

 Lake Township, Benzie County, Michigan
 Lake Charter Township, Michigan in Berrien County
 Lake Township, Huron County, Michigan
 Lake Township, Lake County, Michigan
 Lake Township, Macomb County, Michigan, former civil township 
 Lake Township, Menominee County, Michigan
 Lake Township, Missaukee County, Michigan
 Lake Township, Roscommon County, Michigan

See also 
 Lakefield Township, Luce County, Michigan
 Lakefield Township, Saginaw County, Michigan
 Laketon Township, Michigan in Muskegon County
 Laketown Township, Michigan in Allegan County
 Lake Township (disambiguation)

Michigan township disambiguation pages